Walter Major was a family of Czechoslovak aircraft inline engines developed by Walter Aircraft Engines in the 1930s.

Design and development
License-built in Poland by the state-owned Państwowe Zakłady Inżynieryjne (as the PZInż. Major 4), the engine was used in, among others, Zlin Z-XIII, RWD-11 and one of the PWS-35 Ogar prototypes.

Applications

Walter Major 4
 Beneš-Mráz Be-50 Beta-Minor
 Beneš-Mráz Be-52
 Beneš-Mráz Be-56
 Beneš-Mráz Be-250
 Beneš-Mráz Be-251
 González Gil-Pazó GP-4
 PWS-35 Ogar
 RWD 13 
 RWD 20
 Spartan Cruiser
 Zlin Z-XIII
 Rubik R-18 Kánya

Walter Major 6
 Breda Ba.44
 Caproni Ca.308 Borea
 RWD 11
 Rogožarski SIM-XII-H

Specifications (Major 4)

See also

External links

Oldengine.org
valka.cz

Major
Aircraft air-cooled inline piston engines
1930s aircraft piston engines